Ski Patrol is a 1990 American comedy film directed by Richard Correll and starring Roger Rose, Yvette Nipar, Paul Feig, T. K. Carter, Leslie Jordan, George Lopez, Ray Walston, and Martin Mull.

Plot
There are some ski school instructors who ally with an evil land developer to try to sabotage the ski patrol and convince the Forest Service to cancel the owner's lease on the ski area.  At the end, though, the leader of the Forest Service wises up to the evil ski school's scheme and everything backfires.

Cast
Roger Rose as Jerry Cramer
Yvette Nipar as Ellen
T.K. Carter as Iceman
Leslie Jordan as Murray
Paul Feig as Stanley
Sean Gregory Sullivan as Suicide
Tess Foltyn as Tiana
George Lopez as Eddie Martinez
Corby Timbrook as Lance Finkmayer
Steve Hytner as Myron
Ray Walston as Pops
Martin Mull as Sam Maris
Rascal as Dumpster (the Bulldog)
Deborah Rose as Inspector Edna Crabitz

Production
Parts of the film were shot in Park City and Snowbird, Utah.

References

External links 
 
 

1990 films
1990 comedy films
American comedy films
1990s English-language films
Films shot in Utah
American skiing films
Teen sex comedy films
1990 directorial debut films
1990s American films